Vittorino Colombo (April 3, 1925 – June 1, 1996) was an Italian politician.

Biography 
Colombo was born in Albiate, province of Monza and Brianza, Lombardy. He would go on to get a degree in economics and business. He worked as a trade unionist prior to entering politics among the ranks of the Christian Democracy.

He served in the cabinet of Prime Ministers Mariano Rumor (1974), Giulio Andreotti (1976–1979) and Cossiga (1979–1980). He served as Minister of Health in the Government of Italy from March to November 1974.

He was Deputy in Legislature III (1958–1963), Legislature IV (1963–1968), Legislature V (1968–1972) and Legislature VI (1972–1976).

Later he was elected Senator in Legislature VII (1976–1979), Legislature VIII (1979–1983), Legislature IX (1983–1987), Legislature X (1987–1992) and Legislature XI (1992–1994). 

He served as President of the Senate from May 12 to July 11, 1983.

He died in Milan on June 1, 1996.

Legacy 
Following his death, in 1997 the International Vittorino Colombo Prize was established to honor individuals who contribute to the study and dissemination of authentic values that contribute to solidarity and collaboration among peoples.

He was an important figure in Chinese-Italian relations, he founded the Italian Chinese Institute and the Italy China Foundation, the latter of which he presided over.

References

External links
 
 Italian Parliament Page

|-

|-

|-

|-

|-

|-

1925 births
1996 deaths
People from the Province of Monza e Brianza
Christian Democracy (Italy) politicians
Italian Ministers of Health
Deputies of Legislature III of Italy
Deputies of Legislature IV of Italy
Deputies of Legislature V of Italy
Deputies of Legislature VI of Italy
Senators of Legislature VII of Italy
Senators of Legislature VIII of Italy
Senators of Legislature IX of Italy
Senators of Legislature X of Italy
Senators of Legislature XI of Italy
Politicians of Lombardy